Parting is an online directory of over 15,000 funeral homes in the United States.  The site allows users to view articles, photos, reviews, and prices of funeral homes and mortuaries for free.  Since it is the first and most comprehensive directory to feature pricing, industry professionals have called it disruptive.  The company was founded in 2015 and is based in Los Angeles, California.

References

External links 
 

American review websites
Funerals in the United States